Prose writers and poets who work in the Pashto language include:
  
List of Pashto-language writers may refer to:

Rahman Baba (1653–1711)
Khan Abdul Ghani Khan (1914–1996)
Khushal Khattak (1613–1689)
Hamza Shinwari (1907–1994)

Pashto